"Don't Save Me" is a song by American rock band Haim. The song was released in the United Kingdom on November 8, 2012. It was featured on their debut studio album, Days Are Gone, released in 2013. On December 23, 2012, the song entered the UK Singles Chart at number 74. On January 6, 2013, the song re-entered the UK Singles Chart at number 51, climbing to number 32 the following week. The song premiered on BBC Radio 1 as Zane Lowe's 'Hottest Record' on October 16, 2012. A music video to accompany the release of "Don't Save Me" was first released onto YouTube on November 26, 2012, at a total length of three minutes and fifty-six seconds. On November 23, 2013, the band performed the song on Saturday Night Live. The song impacted radio on October 14, 2014.

Track listing
7" single and digital download
"Don't Save Me" – 3:52
"Send Me Down" – 4:19

10" single
Side A:
"Don't Save Me" – 3:52
"Send Me Down" – 4:19
Side B:
"Don't Save Me" – 5:17

Charts

Certifications

References

2012 singles
Haim (band) songs
Song recordings produced by James Ford (musician)
2012 songs
Polydor Records singles
Songs written by Danielle Haim
Songs written by Este Haim
Songs written by Alana Haim